Mitcham Football Club nicknamed the Tigers, is an Australian rules football team. It is based in the eastern suburbs of Melbourne, Victoria, Australia and is part of the Eastern Football League.

History

Mitcham’s history began when the Box Hill Reporter newspaper sponsored a football competition in 1903. Mitch being a founding club won the first and second premierships. More were to follow before Mitcham left for more competition in the Eastern Suburban FL in the 1930s.

They had some success in 1947 but by the 1955 they had decided to play closer to home and joined the Croydon Ferntree Gully FL.

They were a founding club for the Eastern District Football League in 1962.  Most of their time has been spend in 2nd division.

References

External links
  Official club website
 Official Eastern Football League site

Eastern Football League (Australia) clubs
Australian rules football clubs established in 1888
1888 establishments in Australia
Sport in the City of Whitehorse